The Patriarchal cross is a variant of the Christian cross, the religious symbol of Christianity, and is also known as the Cross of Lorraine. Similar to the familiar Latin cross, the patriarchal cross possesses a smaller crossbar placed above the main one so that both crossbars are near the top. Sometimes the patriarchal cross has a short, slanted crosspiece near its foot (Russian Orthodox cross). This slanted, lower crosspiece often appears in Byzantine Greek and Eastern European iconography, as well as in other Eastern Orthodox churches. In most renditions of the Cross of Lorraine, the horizontal bars are "graded" with the upper bar being the shorter, though variations with the bars of equal length are also seen.

Imagery 

The top beam represents the plaque bearing the inscription "Jesus the Nazarene, King of the Jews" (often abbreviated in the Latinate "INRI" and in the Greek as "INBI"). A popular view is that the slanted bottom beam is a footrest, however, there is no evidence of footrests ever being used during the crucifixion, and it has a deeper meaning. The bottom beam may represent a balance of justice. Some sources suggest that as one of the thieves being crucified with Jesus repented of his sin and believed in  Jesus as the Messiah and was thus with Christ in Paradise, the other thief rejected and mocked Jesus and therefore descended into Hades.

Many symbolic interpretations of the double-cross have been put forth. One of them says that the first horizontal line symbolized the secular power and the other horizontal line the ecclesiastic power of Byzantine emperors, and also that the first cross bar represents the death, and the second cross the resurrection, of Jesus Christ.

Other variations 

The Russian Orthodox cross can be considered a modified version of the Patriarchal cross, having two smaller crossbeams, one at the top and one near the bottom, in addition to the longer crossbeam. One suggestion is the lower crossbeam represents the footrest to which the feet of Jesus were nailed. In some earlier representations (and still currently in the Greek Church) the crossbar near the bottom is straight or slanted upwards. In later Slavic and other traditions, it came to be depicted as slanted, with the side to the viewer's left usually being higher.

One tradition says that this comes from the idea that as Jesus Christ took his last breath, the bar to which his feet were nailed broke, thus slanting to the side. Another tradition holds that the slanted bar represents the repentant thief and the unrepentant thief that were crucified with Christ, the one to Jesus' right-hand repenting and rising to be with God in Paradise, and one on his left falling to Hades and separation from God. In this manner, it also reminds the viewer of the Last Judgment. Still another explanation of the slanted crossbar would suggest the Cross Saltire, as tradition holds that the Apostle St. Andrew introduced Christianity to lands north and west of the Black Sea: today's Ukraine, Russia, Belarus, Moldova, and Romania.

Byzantine Empire 
The Patriarchal cross first regularly appeared on the coinage of the Byzantine Empire starting with the second reign of the Emperor Justinian II, whose second reign was from 705–711. The Emperor Theodosius III, who ruled from 715 to 717, made the Patriarchal cross a standard feature of the gold, silver and bronze coinage minted in Constantinople. After his short reign ended, the practice was discontinued under his successor, Leo III, due to his iconoclastic views, and was not revived again until the middle of the eighth century by Artavasdus.

Hungary
The two-barred cross has been one of the main elements in the coat of arms of Hungary at least since 1190. It appeared during the reign of King Béla III, who was raised in the Byzantine court. He was for a time heir to the throne of the Byzantine Empire and betrothed to the emperor's daughter. When the emperor's wife gave birth to a son, the emperor dissolved his daughter's betrothal to Béla and removed Béla's title of despotes. Soon after Béla left Constantinople when he inherited the Hungarian throne in 1172. The cross started appearing floating in the coat of arms and on the coins from this era. During the middle ages, the two-barred cross became associated with the Árpád dynasty and the Kingdom of Hungary along with the Árpád stripes. The symbol found its way to Western Europe through Hungary, because René the Good, who was related to the House Anjou of Hungary, laid claim to four kingdoms, including Hungary. He placed the symbol on his flags before the battle of Nancy. He won the battle and regained his lost Duchy of Lorraine. Thus the symbol became known in Western-Europe as the Cross of Lorraine.

Lithuania and Belarus 
Another form of the cross was used by the Jagiellonian dynasty. This cross now features on the coat of arms of Lithuania, where it appears on the shield of the Vytis. It is also the badge of the Lithuanian Air Force and forms the country's highest award for bravery, the Order of the Cross of Vytis. The Jagiellonian cross is also used on the coat of arms and flags of every Lithuanian county.

The Patriarchal Cross appears on the Vytis (Pahonia), used at various times as the coat of arms of Lithuania for centuries and of Belarus for four years.

Great Moravia 
The Byzantine Christianization came to the Morava Empire in the year 863, provided at the request of Rastislav sent Byzantine Emperor Michael III. The symbol often referred to as the patriarchal cross, appeared in the Byzantine Empire in large numbers in the 10th century. For a long time, it was thought to have been given to Saint Stephen by the pope as the symbol of the apostolic Kingdom of Hungary.

Russia 
During 1577–1625 the Russian use of the cross was between the heads of the double-headed eagle in the coat of arms of Russia.

Slovakia 

The territory of present-day Slovakia was an integral part of the Kingdom of Hungary from the 10th century until the Treaty of Trianon in 1920. Many of its cities gained privileges and coats of arms from the Hungarian kings, often containing the kings' own coat of arms.

Typefaces

Unicode defines the character ☦ (Russian cross) and ☨ (Cross of Lorraine) in the Miscellaneous Symbols range at code point U+2626 and U+2628 respectively.

See also 

Papal cross
Two-barred cross

References

Sources 

 
 

Crosses by culture
Crosses in heraldry
National symbols of Belarus
National symbols of Hungary
National symbols of Lithuania
National symbols of Slovakia
Crosses by form